The 87th Ohio Infantry Regiment, sometimes 87th Ohio Volunteer Infantry (or 87th OVI) was an infantry regiment in the Union Army during the American Civil War.

Service
The 87th Ohio Infantry was organized at Camp Chase in Columbus, Ohio and mustered in on June 10, 1862, for three months service under Colonel Henry Blackstone Banning.

The regiment left Ohio for Baltimore, Maryland, June 12, and performed duty in the defenses of that city until July 28. Attached to Railroad Brigade, VIII Corps, Middle Department. Ordered to Harpers Ferry, West Virginia, July 28, and attached to Miles' Command. Garrison duty in the defenses of Bolivar Heights until September. Skirmishes at Berlin [now Brunswick] and Point of Rocks, Maryland, September 4–5 (detachment). Defense of Harpers Ferry September 12–15. Surrender of Harpers Ferry September 15. Paroled September 16 and sent to Annapolis, Maryland.

The 87th Ohio mustered out of the service at Camp Chase on September 20, 1862.

Casualties
The regiment lost a total of 6 enlisted men, 1 killed and 5 due to disease.

Commanders
 Colonel Henry B. Banning

Notable members
 Colonel Henry B. Banning - U.S. Representative from Ohio, 1873–1879
 Corporal William Wellington Corlett, Company D - delegate from Wyoming Territory, 1877–1879
 Commissary Sergeant John Philo Hoyt - fourth governor of Arizona Territory, 1877–1878; justice of the Washington Territory Supreme Court, 1879–1887; President of the Washington Constitutional Convention, 1889

See also

 List of Ohio Civil War units
 Ohio in the Civil War

References

 Dyer, Frederick H. A Compendium of the War of the Rebellion (Des Moines, IA:  Dyer Pub. Co.), 1908.
 Ohio Roster Commission. Official Roster of the Soldiers of the State of Ohio in the War on the Rebellion, 1861–1865, Compiled Under the Direction of the Roster Commission (Akron, OH:  Werner Co.), 1886–1895.
 Reid, Whitelaw. Ohio in the War: Her Statesmen, Her Generals, and Soldiers (Cincinnati, OH:  Moore, Wilstach, & Baldwin), 1868. 
 Carman, Ezra A. The Maryland Campaign of September 1862, ed. by Thomas G. Clemens. (New York, NY: Savas Beatie), 2010. 
Attribution

External links
 Ohio in the Civil War: 87th Ohio Volunteer Infantry by Larry Stevens
 National flag of the 87th Ohio Infantry

Military units and formations established in 1862
Military units and formations disestablished in 1862
Units and formations of the Union Army from Ohio
1862 establishments in Ohio